is a caldera lake. It lies near the summit of Mount Haruna, within the city limits of Takasaki, Gunma Prefecture, Japan.

In the summer, the lake is a popular destination for campers. The surface freezes in the winter, and it affords skating and ice fishing for wakasagi.

The lake lies a 90-minute bus ride from Takasaki Station. It can be reached in 40 minutes by car from Shibukawa-Ikaho Interchange, #12 on the Kan-Etsu Expressway. The road to the lake is one of 10 musical roads located in Gunma prefecture alone; the song played is "Sweetly Sings the Donkey," chosen because the melody is known as "At a Quiet Lakeside" in Japan.

A kayōkyoku refers to the lake in its title. Akira Fuse recorded the tune, named Haruna-ko no shōjo. The music is by Rei Nakanishi and the lyrics by Ken'ichirō Morioka.

Parts of the anime and manga Initial D take place on or around the lake, under the fictional name Lake Akina, as Mount Haruna - named Akina (秋名) in the series - is the location of the tōge where Takumi, the protagonist, wins his first races.

Sources
This article incorporates material from the article 榛名湖 (Harunako) in the Japanese Wikipedia, retrieved on March 21, 2008.

External links

観光社会資本の事例 (Kankō Shakai Shihon no Jirei), Ministry of Land, Infrastructure and Transport

Haruna
Landforms of Gunma Prefecture
Tourist attractions in Gunma Prefecture
Haruna